Nautilus is the common name of members of the marine cephalopod family Nautilidae, which also contains the genus Nautilus.

Nautilus may also refer to:

Ships and submarines
 A number of ships named Nautilus

Science
 Nautilus-X, a proposed NASA spacecraft
 Nautilus Deep Space Observatory, a proposed array of space telescopes
 BA 330 inflatable space habitat, also known as Nautilus space complex module
 Tactical High Energy Laser, a military laser system also known as Nautilus

Computing
Nautilus (video game), 1982 Atari home video game
Nautilus (file manager), the official file manager for the GNOME desktop
Nautilus (secure telephone), an early TCP/IP secure telephony software package
VAX 8700/8800, code-named Nautilus, from the VAX 8000 family of Digital Equipment Corporation computers

Organizations
Nautilus (counterculture publisher), an Italian publisher
Nautilus (video game company), formerly Sacnoth, a Japanese video game developer
Nautilus Institute for Security and Sustainability, a public policy think-tank
Nautilus, Inc., American exercise equipment company
Nautilus International, an international trades union and professional association representing seafarers and allied workers
Nautilus Minerals Inc., Australian underwater mining company

Literature
Nautilus Award, Polish science-fiction award
Nautilus Book Awards, American book awards
Nautilus (science magazine)
The Nautilus (journal), malacological journal
The Nautilus (magazine) of the New Thought Movement

Other
 Lincoln Nautilus, a luxury crossover SUV
 Nautilus collection, a luxury sports watch collection by Patek Philippe SA
 Nautilus (Miami Beach), a Mid-Beach neighborhood of Miami Beach, Florida, United States
 Nautilus Mountain, a summit in British Columbia
 Nautilus (photograph), a photograph by Edward Weston
 "Nautilus" (song), from a 1974 Bob James jazz album
 Nautilus (album)
 Brand of Bowers & Wilkins (B&W) speakers
 The variable-resistance cable weight machine is commonly known by its eponymous brand name, Nautilus

See also